The Adventures of Superboy is a series of six-minute animated Superboy cartoons produced by Filmation that were broadcast on CBS between 1966 and 1969. The 34 segments appeared as part of three different programs during that time, packaged with similar shorts featuring The New Adventures of Superman and other DC Comics superheroes.

These adventures marked the animation debut of Superboy, as well as his teenage alter ego Clark Kent, who acted as the bespectacled, mild-mannered disguise for the young hero, Lana Lang, and Krypto the super-powered dog who would accompany his master on every dangerous mission. Other characters such as Martha and Jonathan Kent, foster parents of the Boy of Steel, and the town of Smallville were also faithfully recreated from comic book adventures. As a result of the production's budget, the show featured a great amount of stock animation as well as limited movement from the characters.

Each episode featured the Boy of Steel ducking out of high school and racing into action to battle a wide array of adversaries, from dognappers in "Krypto, K-9 Detective", androids run amok in "The Revolt of Robotville", and alien menaces in "The Spy from Outer Space", to another young hero with similar powers in "Superboy Meets Mighty Lad", and a slew of otherworldly monsters ("The Deep Sea Dragon", "The Visitor from the Earth's Core"). He even wound up being captured and successfully having to fight a gang of small-time crooks—all while in his disguise as Clark Kent—in "The Gorilla Gang". Most of the stories were written by DC writers such as Bob Haney and George Kashdan, while character designs were based closely upon the Superboy comic books of the time.

DVD and video releases
In 1985, Warner Home Video released eight selected episodes of the series on VHS in the "Super Powers" video collection along with Aquaman, Batman, and Superman. These videos were rereleased in 1996 and are out of print.

Although The New Adventures of Superman has been released on DVD, the sets do not include the Superboy shorts because of a battle between Warner Bros. and the estate of Jerry Siegel over the rights to the "Superboy" name that occurred at the time. The series remains unreleased to DVD.

Voice cast
Bob Hastings as Kal-El/Clark Kent / Superboy
Janet Waldo as Lana Lang
Ted Knight as Narrator 
Jackson Beck as Introductory narrator

Episodes

Season 1 (1966–67)
The series premiered on September 10, 1966 as part of a 30-minute program named The New Adventures of Superman, featuring two Superman shorts with one Superboy segment in between.

Asterisk (*) indicates episodes that do not contain narration.

Season 2 (1967–68)
The Superman/Aquaman Hour of Adventure was first broadcast on September 9, 1967.  This 60-minute program included new Superboy and Superman segments, and adventures featuring Aquaman and his sidekick Aqualad. It also comprised a rotating series of 'guest star' cartoons featuring the Atom, the Flash and Kid Flash, Green Lantern, Hawkman and the Teen Titans (Speedy, Kid Flash, Wonder Girl and Aqualad).

Asterisk (*) indicates episodes that do not contain narration.

Season 3 (1968–69)
The Batman/Superman Hour premiered on September 14, 1968, featuring Superboy and Superman shorts alongside the adventures of Batman, Robin and Batgirl.

References

External links
 

1960s American animated television series
Superman television series by Filmation
CBS original programming
1966 American television series debuts
1969 American television series endings
English-language television shows
American children's animated action television series
American children's animated superhero television series
Superboy
Animated television shows based on DC Comics